Washington High School (also known as Washington Court House) is a public high school located in Washington Court House, Ohio in Fayette County, United States.

The former high school was located on Willard Street on the eastern side of town.  Originally, the current middle school was the town's high school, but in the district's late 1960s expansion, the current high school was built. Only one high school exists in the Washington Court House City School District.

Washington Senior High has approximately 50 staff members and approximately 600 students in grades 912.

Athletics
Boys Baseball – 2000

Notable alumni
Travis Shaw, baseball player
Jeff Shaw, baseball player

References

External links
 Washington Court House City School District

High schools in Fayette County, Ohio
Public high schools in Ohio
Washington Court House, Ohio